Local elections were held in the province of Zamboanga del Norte of the Philippines, on May 9, 2022 as part of the 2022 general election. Voters will select candidates for all local positions: a municipal and city mayor, vice mayor and councilors, as well as members of the Sangguniang Panlalawigan, the governor, vice governor and representatives for the three districts of Zamboanga del Norte.

Background

Incumbent governor Roberto Uy is term-limited, and is prohibited from running for a fourth consecutive term. Uy opted to run for city mayor of Dapitan, and his party nominated Evelyn Uy for the position. Evelyn Uy's opponent is Rosalina "Nene" Jalosjos, incumbent and last-termer city mayor of Dapitan, whom she dueled in the 2019 mayoralty.

Opinion polling

Provincial elections

Governor

Vice governor
Incumbent vice governor Senen Angeles is term-limited, and is prohibited from running for a fourth consecutive term. Angeles opted to run for city vice mayor of Dipolog, and his party nominated incumbent 2nd District board member Julius Napigquit for the position.

Provincial board

1st District
Incumbent Anacleto "Boy" Olvis Jr. did not run for reelection, while incumbent Patri "Jing" Chan is running for reelection for a third mandate. Vying for a seat for the district include incumbent Dapitan councilor Angelica Jalosjos Carreon, former board member Jose Joy Olvis, and Dapitan-based lawyer Pete Zamora.

2nd District
Incumbents Julius Napigquit, Crisologo "Logoy" Decierdo, Romulo "Muling" Soliva, and Ronillo "Boy" Lee are all ineligible for reelection. Napigquit opted to run for vice governor, while Soliva opted to run for city councilor of Dipolog. Vying for a seat for the district are term-limited Dipolog councilors Peter Co and Jasmin Pinsoy-Lagutin, former city councilor Dante Bagarinao, former Roxas municipal mayor Ed Yebes, and radio broadcasters Raymond Acopiado and Nick Carbonel. Bagarinao, who ran for board member in the 1st district in the 2019 local elections, is making his run for the position in this district.

3rd District
Incumbents Venus Uy, Luzviminda "Bebe" Torrino, and Ruth Brillantes are ineligible for reelection, but incumbent Constantino "Boy" Soriano Jr. is running for reelection. Venus Uy opted to run for Sangguniang Bayan member of Liloy. Vying for seats for the district include incumbent Liloy Sangguniang Bayan members Kay Marie Bolando and Leo Nicanor Mejorada, and former Dapitan administrator Wilberth "Jojo" Magallanes. Conkee Buctuan, who previously made a run for this position in 2019, is making his second attempt for the position.

Congressional elections

Incumbents Romeo Jalosjos Jr. of the 1st district and Glona Labadlabad of the 2nd district are running for reelection; fellow incumbent Isagani Amatong of the 3rd district, an ally of the Uys, is term-limited and ineligible for re-election. Amatong's party, the Liberal Party, nominated Ian Amatong for the position. Challenging the younger Amatong is former 3rd district representative Cesar Jalosjos.

1st District

Controversy 
As Uy's votes outnumbered that of Jalosjos and was poised to be the new winner, the Provincial Board of Canvassers (PBOC) did not proclaim Uy as the winning candidate. This comes after then-COMELEC Chairman Saidamen Pangarungan allegedly sent a proclamation suspension order to PBOC chair Verly Adanza through email to halt Uy's proclamation pending a disqualification case filed against Federico "Kuya Jan" Jalosjos, a candidate that bears a similar name to the incumbent congressman. Apart from that, as the majority of the PBOC were to declare Uy as the winning candidate, Pangarungan supposedly called and advised Adanza not to continue with Uy's proclamation. This led to debates between the PBOC and the two opposing camps, especially as Uy's camp complained that the order was "undated, did not contain a notice to parties, and was not released through the COMELEC clerk" according to Rappler. One of Uy's lawyers, James Verduguez, claimed they reached out to Pangarungan for comment, and the elections chief claimed he has "no idea about what (they're) talking about.”

After over a month, the COMELEC proclaimed the incumbent Jalosjos the winning candidate as they added the nuisance "Kuya Jan" Jalosjos's votes to the incumbent's vote count, to garner 74,533 votes making him the legitimate winner of the race. On July 21, 2022, days prior to the opening of the 19th Congress, the Supreme Court of the Philippines issued a status quo ante order removing the incumbent Jalosjos from his seat after the high court granted the Uy camp's plea to halt COMELEC's crediting of "Kuya Jan" Jalosjos's 5,424 votes to the incumbent Jalosjos, and rendering actions done after its May 12 ruling as "unenforceable."

2nd District

3rd District

City and municipal elections

1st district

Dapitan
Incumbent mayor Rosalina Jalosjos is ineligible for reelection, and opted to run for governor. Her party nominated former 1st district representative Bullet Jalosjos as their nominee. Ruel Nadela of the National Unity Party filed his candidacy for mayor, but was either removed or withdrawn from the list of candidates for an undisclosed reason.

La Libertad
Incumbent mayor Romeo Mejias is term-limited and prohibited from running for a fourth consecutive term. His party fielded Liza Mejias for the position, with Romeo Mejias himself running for vice mayor.

Mutia
Incumbent mayor Lorrymir Adasa is running for re-election, against former Zamboanga del Norte Electric Cooperative general manager Adelmo Laput. Incumbent vice mayor Arthur Tenorio, who is eligible for re-election, initially opted not to run, but had his decision changed.

Piñan (New Piñan)
Incumbent Vice Mayor Junjun Cimafranca opted to run for mayor. His party fielded incumbent Councilor Rommel Gudmalin for Vice Mayor.

Polanco
Incumbents mayor Boyet Olvis and vice mayor Fred Bait-it are running for re-election.

Rizal 
Incumbents mayor Fiona Manigsaca and vice mayor Riel Manigsaca are running for re-election.

Sergio Osmeña Sr. 
Incumbent mayor Augustines Magsalay is running for re-election.

Sibutad
Incumbents mayor Fracio Caidic and vice mayor Naring Obnimaga are running for re-election.

2nd district

Dipolog
Incumbent mayor Darel Dexter Uy is running for re-election; incumbent vice mayor Horacio Velasco is term-limited and ineligible to run for reelection. Uy's party nominated incumbent vice governor Senen Angeles for city vice mayor. Mayor Uy will face Rommel Jalosjos, businessman and former governor of Zamboanga Sibugay. Lawyer and former Jalosjos-ally Clyde Naong, who ran and was defeated in the 2019 mayoralty, is making his second attempt for the position.

| colspan="7" style="background:black;"|

Jose Dalman (Ponot)
Mayor Rachel "Inday" Ferrater and Vice Mayor Edwin Dalam, both incumbents elected after the 2019 election, are term-limited and are prohibited from running for a fourth consecutive term. Ferrater's party, PDP-Laban, fielded Allen Ferrater as their candidate for mayor. On the other hand, Dalam is running for mayor under the Nacionalista Party.

Katipunan
Mayor Patchie Eguia is running for re-election. Incumbent vice mayor Tessie Matildo of PDP-Laban, who replaced then winning vice mayor (in the 2019 election) Crisostomo "Cris" Eguia Jr. after being convicted for unliquidated cash advantages during his time as mayor, is eligible for re-election, but opted to run for SB Member. Her party nominated incumbent SB Members Maiko Wong and Nonie Jumawak as candidates for mayor and vice mayor respectively.

Manukan
Incumbents mayor Eugene Caballero and vice mayor Enriquita Winters are running for re-election.

Pres. Manuel A. Roxas
Incumbent mayor Jan Hendrick Vallecer is term-limited and ineligible for re-election. His party nominated incumbent vice mayor Junior Rengquijo as their mayoralty candidate.

Siayan
Incumbent mayor Josecor Gepolongca is eligible for re-election, but opted to run for vice mayor. His party nominated former mayor Flora Villarosa for mayor.

Sindangan
Incumbents mayor Dodoy Labadlabad and vice mayor Boy Sy are running for re-election.

3rd district

Baliguian
Incumbent Mayor Albina "Obing" Esmali opted not to run for re-election. Vice Mayor Gani Esmali, who was re-elected for the position after the 2019 election, died in an ambush in Siocon on January 11, 2020. With this, top ranking SB Member Dulcisimo Bontia Jr. took over Vice Mayor Esmali's place in succession.

Godod
Incumbent mayor Toto Matildo is running unopposed; incumbent vice mayor Ferdinand "Banoy" Caboverde is running for SB Member, and incumbent SB Member Samuel "Lolong" Labad is running to take his place without opposition.

Gutalac
Mayor Onesimo "Jun" Coma and Vice Mayor Joel Tendero, both incumbents elected after the 2019 election, are term-limited and are prohibited from running for a fourth consecutive term. Coma's party, PDP-Laban, fielded Justin Quimbo as their candidate for mayor with Coma himself running for vice mayor. On the other hand, Tendero is running for mayor under PROMDI.

Kalawit 
Incumbents mayor Jun Antojado and vice mayor Merly Masugbo are running for re-election.

Labason
Mayor Eddie Quimbo, who was re-elected after the 2019 election, is term-limited and prohibited from running for a fourth consecutive term. Quimbo's party, PDP-Laban, fielded Jed Quimbo as their candidate for mayor with incumbent vice mayor Virgilio "Tony Yap" Go running for re-election.

Leon B. Postigo (Bacungan)
Mayor Hermogenes "Remie" Cordova, who was re-elected as Mayor after the 2019 local elections, passed away in 2020, and Vice Mayor Aidaroz Hambali took over Cordova's place as Mayor of Leon B. Postigo in succession.

Liloy
Incumbents mayor Jun Uy and vice mayor John Momar Insong are running for re-election, with the former running for re-election unopposed.

Salug 
Incumbent vice mayor William Maribojoc is term-limited, and opted to run for mayor.

Sibuco

Siocon
Incumbent mayor Julius Lobrigas is term-limited and prohibited from running for a fourth term. His party fielded Jinky Lobrigas as candidate for mayor, with Julius Lobrigas himself running for vice mayor. Incumbent vice mayor Karon Esmali is eligible, and is running for re-election as vice mayor.

Sirawai

Tampilisan

Notes

References

External links
COMELEC official website

2022 Philippine local elections
Elections in Zamboanga del Norte
Politics of Zamboanga del Norte
May 2022 events in the Philippines